Bishop Neale MacCabe CM (23 June 1816 – 22 July 1870), was an Irish Vincentian priest who served as Bishop of Ardagh and Clonmacnoise.

Early life, family and education
MacCabe was from Crosdrum, County Meath. He was educated in the Vincentian Castleknock College, in Dublin and trained for the priesthood at the Irish College in Paris.

Career
MacCabe served in St. Vincents, Sundays Well, Cork from 1865 to 1866. In 1866, Dr. McCabe was appointed Rector of the Irish College in Paris. In 1867, he was ordained a bishop for Ardagh and Clonmacnoise.

Death
Bishop MacCabe died in office on 22 July 1870, after he took ill at Marseilles on the way to Civitavecchia, going to the first Vatican Council. His funeral was in the Vincentian Chapel on Rue de Sèvres, Paris and his interment in a vault of Head House of Vincentians, in Montparnasse, Paris.

Notes

References

1870 deaths
1816 births
People educated at Castleknock College
Irish Vincentians
Roman Catholic bishops of Ardagh and Clonmacnoise
People from County Meath